Tehatta High School is a school at Tehatta in Nadia district, West Bengal, India. This is a boys school for secondary and co-edecation School for higher secondary level students. Its medium of instruction is Bengali. The school was established in 1951.

School uniform
 Boys:
White shirt with the school badge stitched on the shirt's pocket, Navy blue pant. 
 Girls:
White Saree with Navy blue border and Navy blue blouse.

Events
 Sports events are run during the annual sports.
 Independence day is celebrated with a ceremony every year on 15 August in the school premises.
 Republic Day is celebrated with a ceremony every year on 26 January in the school premises.
 Saraswati Puja is one of the main festivals held in the school.
 An annual arts fair is held at the time of Saraswati Puja. The students contribute crafts, drawing competition, debate, and recitation.

References

High schools and secondary schools in West Bengal
Schools in Nadia district
1951 establishments in West Bengal
Educational institutions established in 1951